There are many mountains called Boulder Mountain, including:

 Boulder Mountain (Colorado), high mountain summit
 Boulder Mountain (Utah), a high plateau in central Utah, near Capitol Reef National Park
 Boulder Mountain (British Columbia) near Tulameen, British Columbia, Canada
 Boulder Mountain (Monashee Mountains) near Revelstoke, British Columbia
 Boulder Mountains (Montana) - a range west of Helena, Montana
 Boulder Mountains (Idaho) - a range in central Idaho, north of Sun Valley